Lee Pui Ming (李佩鳴; Cantonese: Lei5 Pui3 Ming4; born 1956, in Hong Kong) is a Hong Kong-born American pianist, vocalist, and composer. Her work combines elements of contemporary classical music, jazz, and Chinese music. She is one of the most notable figures in the Asian American jazz movement.

Life
She was born in 1956 and she was three when she began to play the piano.

In 1976, she came to the United States to pursue music studies, earning bachelor's and master's degrees, and most of a doctorate. In 1985, she relocated to Toronto, Ontario, Canada, and became active in that city's new music scene in the early 1990s. She leads an ensemble that has toured Asia and Canada.

Her 1994 album, Nine-Fold Heart, was nominated for a Juno Award for Best Global Recording.

Lee has performed with Joëlle Léandre, Otomo Yoshihide, Chris Cutler, René Lussier, Jean Derome, and Pierre Tanguay. She has also composed music for several films.

Discography
1991 - Ming (Pochee)
1994 - Nine-Fold Heart (Pochee) 
1994 - Strange Beauty: New Music For Piano (Dorian)
1999 - Taklamakan (Pochee)
2002 - Who's Playing (Ambiances Magnétiques)

See also
Asian American jazz

References

External links
Lee Pui Ming official site
Lee Pui Ming biography
[ Allmusic entry for Lee Pui Ming]

1956 births
American women composers
American jazz composers
Women jazz composers
American jazz pianists
American jazz singers
American musicians of Chinese descent
Hong Kong emigrants to the United States
Living people
Musicians from Ontario
20th-century American pianists
20th-century American women pianists
21st-century American pianists
21st-century American women pianists